William Claiborne Ferguson IV (born April 15, 1983) is an American politician, attorney, and former schoolteacher. He is a Democratic member of the Maryland Senate, representing the 46th district since 2011, and serving as the President of the Maryland Senate since 2020. The district is composed of parts of Baltimore City.

Education and early career
Ferguson was born in Silver Spring, Maryland and graduated from Georgetown Preparatory School and Davidson College with a double major in political science and economics in 2005. He then joined Teach For America, teaching history and government to ninth and tenth graders at Southwestern High School in Baltimore for two years. In 2007, he earned a Master of Arts degree from the Johns Hopkins School of Education. Since 2012, Ferguson has served as the director of reform initiatives at the Johns Hopkins School of Education.

Ferguson served as a community liaison on educational issues for Sheila Dixon, the president of the Baltimore City Council, from 2005 to 2006. From 2009 to 2010, he was a special assistant to Andres Alonso, the chief executive officer of Baltimore City Public Schools. He graduated magna cum laude from the University of Maryland Francis King Carey School of Law with a Juris Doctor in 2010.

In the legislature
In 2010, Ferguson challenged six-term incumbent George W. Della, Jr. for the Democratic nomination for the 46th district in the Maryland Senate. He won the primary election by a margin of 59-41%. Running in a heavily Democratic district, he won the general election with no formal opposition, receiving 98% of the vote. He is the youngest state senator ever elected in Maryland. His youth earned him the nickname of "Baby Senator".

On October 24, 2019, Senate Democrats unanimously voted to nominate Ferguson to succeed Senate President Thomas V. Mike Miller. Ferguson was perceived as more progressive than Miller. He was sworn in as Senate President on January 8, 2020.

Personal life
Ferguson is married to Lea (née Smith), who he proposed to during the inauguration of Barack Obama in 2009. Together, they live in Canton and have two children, Caleb and Cora, and two dogs.

Political positions

Education
Ferguson supports the Kirwan Commission recommendations and served on the Commission on Innovation and Excellence in Education before becoming President of the Maryland Senate.

Ferguson opposed legislation introduced during the 2015 legislative session that would have armed school resource officers while they patrolled schools, calling it a "counterproductive strategy" and saying that counseling and other services would be more useful in enhancing school safety.

In 2018, Ferguson blamed Governor Larry Hogan after Baltimore schools closed early amid facilities problems, saying that the governor did not provide adequate funding for public schools.

Environment
In 2019, Ferguson voted in favor of an amendment to make the Wheelabrator Incinerator ineligible to receive renewable energy subsidies, which passed in a 34-12 vote.

Marijuana
Ferguson supports the legalization of recreational marijuana, saying he'd support legalizing it by passing a law during the General Assembly session. In 2021, he co-sponsored legislation to legalize marijuana. In 2022, Ferguson said that a voter referendum to legalize marijuana "wouldn't be his first choice", but stressed that it would be unfair to put the question before the voters without letting them know the details of the state's marijuana program.

Policing
During the 2018 legislative session, Ferguson introduced legislation that would establish a Commission to Restore Trust in Policing to investigate the Baltimore Police Department's Gun Trace Task Force, whose members' abuse of power over several years resulted in federal convictions of eight of the unit's nine officers on racketeering charges related to a robbery and extortion scheme. The bill passed both chambers unanimously and was signed into law by Governor Hogan on May 15, 2018. The Commission published its final report on December 2, 2020. In February 2021, Ferguson said that he would support repealing and replacing the state's Law Enforcement Officers' Bill of Rights.

In March 2021, Ferguson said that he would support giving Baltimore full local control of its police department, supporting a bill to include a city charter amendment to do so on the ballots of Baltimore voters as soon as 2022. The bill passed both chambers and became law on May 8, 2021.

In October 2021, Ferguson spoke out against Governor Hogan's proposal to increase funding for local law enforcement, saying in a statement that "divisive rhetoric does not make us safer" and that "improving public safety isn't about just writing a bigger check", but said that lawmakers "support investments that enhance trust and safety".

Social issues
Ferguson was a co-sponsor of the Civil Marriage Protection Act, which legalized same-sex marriage in Maryland.

In June 2021, Ferguson spoke out against Governor Hogan's decision to opt out of federal unemployment insurance programs provided under the American Rescue Plan Act, writing a letter to the governor urging him to rethink the decision.

During the 2022 legislative session, Ferguson introduced legislation that would require companies on The Block in Baltimore to close at 10 p.m. nightly. Following a compromise made between city politicians and venues on The Block, the bill was amended to require clubs to hire off-duty Baltimore police officers to patrol the nightlife district three nights a week and implement new security rules. The bill unanimously passed both chambers and became law on April 9, 2022.

Taxes
In 2020, Ferguson stated that he would be opposed to an across-the-board increase in taxes to pay for the Blueprint for Maryland's Future, a sweeping education reform bill. During that year's legislative session, he introduced legislation that would levy a tax on digital advertising to pay for the Commission's reforms, which passed but was vetoed by Governor Hogan on May 7, 2020. The General Assembly voted to override the governor's veto on February 12, 2021.

In May 2022, Ferguson rejected calls for an extension to Maryland's fuel tax holiday, claiming it would have "long-term consequences" for critical infrastructure in the state.

Transportation
In 2013, Ferguson called for a "rethink" of the Red Line, backing a proposal by the Right Rail Coalition to replace the eastern leg of the Red Line with a streetcar network.

In 2015, Ferguson sponsored legislation that would regulate and tax ridesharing companies in Maryland, but also allow such companies to operate under less regulations than traditional taxi companies. The bill passed and was signed into law by Governor Hogan on April 14, 2015.

Electoral history

References

1983 births
21st-century American politicians
Davidson College alumni
Johns Hopkins School of Education alumni
Living people
Maryland lawyers
Democratic Party Maryland state senators
People from Silver Spring, Maryland
Politicians from Baltimore
Presidents of the Maryland State Senate
Schoolteachers from Maryland
Teach For America alumni
University of Maryland Francis King Carey School of Law alumni